Pierre Lévêque (11 August 1921, in Chambéry – 5 March 2004, in Paris) was a 20th-century French historian of ancient and Hellenistic Greece.

Biography

Training 
The son of an engineer, he spent his youth in the port of Bordeaux. Reading La Cité grecque by Gustave Glotz, pushed him towards literary studies: he was received in 1940 in the École normale supérieure de la rue d'Ulm then at the agrégation de lettres in 1944. A member of the French School at Athens from 1947 to 1952, he studied in Greece archaic statuary of Delos and excavated the site of Thasos.

Works (selection) 

1961: Nous partons pour... La Grèce
1964: L'aventure grecque
1964: Clisthène l'Athénien, 1964 (with Pierre Vidal-Naquet) [Cleisthenes the Athenian: An Essay on the Representation of Space and of Time in Greek Political Thought from the End of the Sixth Century to the Death of Plato, Humanities Press, 1996]
1966: Nous partons pour... La Sicile, PUF
1966: 
1968: Empires et barbaries
1985: Bêtes, dieux et hommes
1985: Le Japon des mythes anciens
1990: La Naissance de la Grèce : Des Rois aux Cités, collection « Découvertes Gallimard » (nº 86), série Histoire. Paris: Gallimard, 176pp., 
1994: 
1994: 
1994: Les Grenouilles dans l'Antiquité
2003: Dans les pas des dieux grecs

External links 
 Pierre Lévêque on data.bnf.fr
 Hommage à Pierre Lévêque on Kernos
 Souvenirs du vingtième siècle 

20th-century French historians
French hellenists
École Normale Supérieure alumni
Members of the French School at Athens
1921 births
Writers from Chambéry
2004 deaths